Cara Katherine Walls (born June 16, 1993) is an American professional soccer player, from Wauwatosa, Wisconsin, who previously played forward for the Chicago Red Stars.

High school
Cara Walls attended Wauwatosa East High School.
She led FC Milwaukee under-18 team to win the national championships, and as the top scorer was winner of the golden ball. Walls helped FC Milwaukee Nationals club win the state title. She was also a member of the high school honor roll.

University of Wisconsin
Cara Walls played for the Wisconsin Badgers between 2011 and 2014. During her freshman year she was named Player of the Week 3 times. In 2012, Walls was named the Badgers' Offensive Player of the Year. In her senior year, Walls was named to All Big-Ten First Team, as well as Big-Ten All-Tournament Team.
Cara Walls is the Badgers' second all time goal scorer with 42 goals, and holds the record of 10 multi-goal games.

Club career

Chicago Red Stars, 2015–2016
Walls was drafted by Chicago Red Stars as the 23rd overall pick in the 2015 NWSL College Draft.
On April 16, 2015 Chicago Red Stars announced the signing of Cara Walls for 2015 National Women's Soccer League season. On April 9, 2015, Cara Walls scored her first professional goal in a 3–0 win against Boston Breakers to place the Red Stars at the top of the NWSL league.

Walls was waived by the Red Stars ahead of the 2017 season.

Personal
Cara Walls' parents are Sarah Gingrass and Andre Walls. She has two sisters, Vinessa and Alayah, and a brother, Tony who is also a professional soccer player.

References

External links 
 

1993 births
Living people
People from Wauwatosa, Wisconsin
Soccer players from Milwaukee
American women's soccer players
National Women's Soccer League players
Chicago Red Stars players
Women's association football forwards
Wisconsin Badgers women's soccer players
Chicago Red Stars draft picks